Events in the year 1856 in Brazil.

Incumbents
Monarch – Pedro II.
Prime Minister – Marquis of Paraná (until 3 September), Marquis of Caxias (starting 3 September).

Events
June 19 - Foundation of Ribeirao Preto

Births

Deaths

References

 
1850s in Brazil
Years of the 19th century in Brazil
Brazil
Brazil